Coleophora crossanthes is a moth of the family Coleophoridae that is endemic to the Democratic Republic of the Congo.

References

External links

crossanthes
Moths of Africa
Endemic fauna of the Democratic Republic of the Congo
Moths described in 1938
Insects of the Democratic Republic of the Congo